The 2020 Chinese Champions League, officially known as the  SWM Motors 2020 Chinese Football Association Member Association Champions League for sponsorship reasons, was the 19th season since its establishment in 2002. The season was postponed following the COVID-19 pandemic, and canceled Regional Competition stage. On 3 November 2020, Chinese Football Association announced that the season would start on 21 November 2020 and conclude on 30 November 2020.

Promotion and relegation

From Champions League
Teams promoted to China League Two
 Nanjing Fengfan
 Shenzhen Bogang
 Xi'an UKD
 Shanghai Jiading Boji
 Qingdao Zhongchuang Hengtai
Teams relegated to CFA member associations leagues / cups or lower tiers

All other teams from last season relegated to tier 5 or lower.

To Champions League
Teams promoted from 15 CFA member associations leagues and 1 host team.

Qualified teams

Hengbei Football Town Group

Group A

Group B

Semi-finals

Overview

Matches

Final

Overview

Match

R&F Football School Group

Group C

Group D

Semi-finals

Overview

Matches

Final

Overview

Match

Knockout stage

References

External links

4